The Morris Ten announced 1 September 1932 is a medium-sized car introduced for 1933 as the company's offering in the important 10 hp sector of the British market. It continued through a series of variants until October 1948 when along with Morris's Twelve and Fourteen it was replaced by the 13.5 hp Morris Oxford MO. 


Morris Ten and Ten Four

Morris Ten was a new class of car for Morris now equipped with wire wheels and a new type of mud guarding—domed wings with wing side shields—it was powered by a Morris 1292 cc four-cylinder side-valve engine employing a single SU carburettor which produced 24 bhp at 3,200 rpm. The gearbox was a four-speed manual transmission unit, behind a wet cork clutch and Lockheed hydraulic brakes were fitted to 19 inch wheels. Early models had a centre accelerator pedal and large sidelamps on the wings, the propeller shaft had Cardan (Rag joint) disc couplings made from leather. After 1933 wheels became 18 inch and the accelerator pedal was moved to the right of the cluster to become the modern convention.

The October 1932 Olympia Motor Show introductory prices:
 chassis £127.10.0
 coach-built saloon with sliding head £169.10.0
 special coupé with sliding head £195.0.0
Body styles at launch in August 1932 were restricted to a saloon and two-door coupé, but a four-door tourer joined the range in December, followed in 1934 by a two-seater with dickey seat and a Traveller's Saloon.

Ten Four

Twelve months later, with the introduction of the Ten Six, Four was added to the Ten's name. The chassis was strengthened, engine mountings were revised and synchromesh appeared on the gearbox.  Engine output was increased to 27½ bhp by April 1934. Two tone paint schemes were optional from 1935.

Morris Ten Six

On 28 August 1933 a 12 hp six-cylinder version of the Ten was announced on the longer-wheelbase chassis of the Cowley Four.

 Prices
 Special coupé £215
 Traveller's saloon £200
 Sliding head saloon £189.10.0
 Fixed head saloon £184
 Tourer £184
 Two-seater £180

A sporting version, the Ten-Six Special was also made in small numbers with tuned engine and twin SU carburettors. the standard body was an open four-seater, but some chassis were supplied to coachbuilders.

Ten Six Special sports
The Morris Ten Six Special sports displayed at Olympia in October 1933 had a long bonnet with a strap, louvred valances by the frame without running boards, low-sloping or cutaway doors, and a flared back with a low tail. Its chassis was as the Ten Six with twin carburettors, a special radiator with stone-guard, spring steering wheel, special speedometer and revolution indicator, remote gearbox control, two horns, an electric petrol pump and automatic ignition advance.

Morris Ten series II

A rationalisation of the Morris range took place in 1935 and the new Ten series II shared its body and chassis with the Morris Twelve series II. A three-speed manual gearbox was fitted at first, but a four-speed reappeared as an option from 1936 and standard from 1937. Steel disc Easiclene wheels replaced the wire ones at the end of 1936. Two tone paintwork is common.

Morris Ten series III

For 1938 the engine was updated to overhead valve as fitted to the Wolseley Ten increasing the power output from 27 to 37.5 bhp. The chromium-plated radiator surround was replaced by a painted one, and all paint schemes were single, rather than two-tone.

Morris Ten Series M

The Morris Ten Series M was introduced in 1938. Although an overhead valve engine like the M-Series engine fitted to the previous Ten Series E, the X-Series was a brand new design following the disappointing performance and reliability of M-Series, which was related to the older Morris sidevalve engines. The Series M's X-Series engine had a 'free-flow' eight-port cylinder head and adopted features from contemporary American engines including a pressurised pump-driven cooling system, a fully filtered lubrication system and an automatic tensioner for the camshaft chain. Along with the contemporary Vauxhall 10-4 the Series M was one of the first mass-market British cars to feature an OHV engine and the Morris was praised for the smoothness, efficiency and quiet-running of its engine. The running gear was otherwise very conventional, even old-fashioned, for the time, with solid axles with longitudinal leaf springs all-round. Plans had been drawn up to provide the unitary-construction Ten with independent front suspension and Rack and pinion steering, but these were shelved due to cost and marketing concerns, although the parts designed for the Series M would appear in the post-war MG Y-type saloon.

Only saloon bodies with optional sun roof were made for the civilian market but a range of pick up bodies were fitted during World War II as one of among many similar products by British manufactures collectively known by the nickname "Tillies".  The car was also assembled in India as the Hindustan 10 .

Postwar models can be distinguished from those made before late 1945 by a cosmetic change to the radiator grille, the later versions being rounder, faired in to the engine side panels and without the Morris badge at the top.

References

External links

Full colour brochures
 Morris Ten Four Morris Ten Six 1934
 Morris Ten Four series III
 Morris Ten series M
 The Morris Register
 The Morris Register of Victoria (Australia)
 Morris Register of New Zealand Inc

Ten
Cars introduced in 1933
1940s cars